Bagh Muri (also Romanized as Bāgh Mūrī, Bāgh-e Mūrī, Bāgh-e Nūrī, and Bāgh-i-Mūrī) is a village in Pachehlak-e Gharbi Rural District, in the Central District of Azna County, Lorestan Province, Iran. At the 2006 census, its population was 724, in 167 families.

References 

Towns and villages in Azna County